Månsson may refer to:

 Fabian Månsson (1872–1938), Swedish Socialist politician
 Gertrud Månsson (1866–1935), Swedish politician, first woman in the Stockholm city council.
 Månsson (writer) (1490–1557), Swedish ecclesiastic and writer